The Baited Trap is a 1926 American silent Western film directed by Stuart Paton and starring Ben F. Wilson, Neva Gerber and Al Ferguson.

Cast
 Ben F. Wilson as Jim Banning 
 Neva Gerber as Helen Alder 
 Al Ferguson as Robert Barton 
 Monty O'Grady as Bobbie 
 Ashton Dearholt as Red Killifer 
 Lafe McKee as Bobbie's Father

References

External links
 

1926 films
1926 Western (genre) films
Films directed by Stuart Paton
Rayart Pictures films
American black-and-white films
Silent American Western (genre) films
1920s English-language films
1920s American films